Parnamirim is a city in the state of Rio Grande do Norte, Brazil, next to the state capital city of Natal and part of its metropolitan area.

Natal Air Force Base - ALA10, one of the most important bases of the Brazilian Air Force, is located in Parnamirim at the former Augusto Severo International Airport. The site is also home to Barreira do Inferno rocket launch base.

References

External links 
 
 

Municipalities in Rio Grande do Norte
Populated coastal places in Rio Grande do Norte